Fight Back to School 3 (逃學威龍3之龍過雞年) is a Hong Kong comedy film produced in 1993 starring Stephen Chow, Anita Mui and Anthony Wong Chau-sang. The film was written and directed by Wong Jing, who replaced Gordon Chan as the director of the final installment after the 1992 film Fight Back to School II and the 1991 film Fight Back to School.

Plot
Chow Sing-Sing (Stephen Chow) is the obnoxious undercover cop who seems to get into all sorts of trouble, only this time he does not go back to school. Instead, Chow goes undercover as the husband of a wealthy socialite (Anita Mui), which does not sit well with his fiancée played by Cheung Man who tries to convince Chow to quit working as undercover.

Cast and roles
 Stephen Chow - Star Chow, Million Wong
 Anita Mui - Judy Tong Wong
 Sharla Cheung - Man
 Anthony Wong Chau-sang - Tailor Lam
 Natalis Chan - Man's Cousin
 Philip Chan - Officer Chan
 John Ching - Devil of Gamblers
 Kathy Chow Hoi-mei - Ching Man Ching
 Paul Chun - Mr. Hung 'King of Gamblers'
 Bryan Leung - Officer Lai
 Mimi Chu - Japanese Housekeeper

Reception
Phil Mills of FarEastFilms.com felt that Fight Back to School 3 was the poorest of the three in the series, and that "no attempt is made to connect it to its predecessors".

References

External links
 Fight Back to School III at the Hong Kong Movie Database
 

1993 films
1993 comedy films
1990s Cantonese-language films
Films directed by Wong Jing
Hong Kong comedy films
Hong Kong sequel films
1990s Hong Kong films